The 2010 Larry H. Miller Dealerships Utah Grand Prix was held at Miller Motorsports Park during July 9–11, 2010. It was the fourth round of the 2010 American Le Mans Series season.

Qualifying
The qualifying session saw Simon Pagenaud give Highcroft Racing the overall pole. Gunnar Jeannette took LMPC pole for Green Earth Team Gunnar, Gianmaria Bruni took the GT pole for Risi and reigning Porsche Supercup champion Jeroen Bleekemolen took GTC pole for Black Swan Racing.

Qualifying result
Pole position winners in each class are marked in bold.

Race

Race result
Class winners in bold. Cars failing to complete 70% of their class winner's distance are marked as Not Classified (NC).

References

Utah Grand Prix
Utah